These are the international rankings of the Republic of the Congo

International rankings

References

Congo, Republic of the